Stříbrný (feminine Stříbrná) is a Czech surname meaning "silver". It may refer to:
 Jiří Stříbrný, Czech interwar politician
 Josef Stříbrný, Czech ice hockey player

See also
 Stříbrná, a municipality and village
 Stříbrná Skalice, a municipality and village
 Stříbrné Hory, a municipality and village
 Smogornia, a mountain
 Stříbrný vítr, a Czech novel written by Fráňa Šrámek
 Stříbrný vítr (film), a Czech film

Czech words and phrases
Czech-language surnames